The yellow-green brushfinch (Atlapetes luteoviridis) is a species of bird in the family Passerellidae.

It is endemic to Panama. Its natural habitat is subtropical or tropical moist montane forest where it is threatened by habitat loss.

References

yellow-green brushfinch
Birds of the Talamancan montane forests
Endemic birds of Panama
yellow-green brushfinch
yellow-green brushfinch
Taxonomy articles created by Polbot
Taxobox binomials not recognized by IUCN